Tagima is a Brazilian guitar manufacturing company based in São Bernardo do Campo, São Paulo.

The company currently produces electric, acoustic and classical guitars and basses.
 
In the 1980s, Seizi Tajima began to produce his own electric guitars and basses. After becoming successful, in 1996 he sold the rights to the "Tagima" name to Marutec Music, a local importer of musical instruments. Tagima kept helping its development, becoming the most famous Brazilian luthier. After the sold to Marutec, Tagima instruments were exhibited at MusikMesse (in Frankfurt) and NAMM Show in Los Angeles. The company also signed an agreement with the IG&T (Guitar and Technology Institute of São Paulo) to be the exclusive supplier of instruments of the school.

Tagima also hired luthier Marcio Zaganin (regarded as the main luthier in Brazil) to take over the development, production, and quality control of instruments manufactured by Tagima.

Tagima also partnered with Volkswagen to create a Volkswagen Gol vintage model to celebrate the 30th anniversary of the vehicle.

Gallery

References

External links
 Official website

Companies based in São Paulo (state)
Guitar manufacturing companies
Bass guitar manufacturing companies
Musical instrument manufacturing companies of Brazil
Brazilian brands